Exelastis montischristi is a species of moth in the genus Exelastis known from Hispaniola, Ecuador, Grenada, Jamaica, Martinique, the Virgin Islands, Florida and Texas. It has also been recorded from Tanzania.

Adults take flight in January, July and August, and have a wingspan of about 16 millimetres. The forewings are light grayish brown with mixed beige scales and some scattered dark brown scales and the hindwings are uniformly dark grayish brown with somewhat lighter fringes.

Its host plant is Rhynchosia minima. The larvae are mostly found on small seedling plants and only rarely on mats of older vines. Final instar larvae are about 9 mm long and light green with a dark green middorsal line and raised ivory longitudinal ridges.

References

Exelastini
Insects of Tanzania
Moths of Africa
Moths described in 1897